Leon Whittaker (born 16 April 1985)) is a Caymanian footballer currently playing for George Town SC.

International career

Under-18

First Team
Whittaker made his debut for the Cayman Islands national football team in a February 2001 friendly match against Trinidad & Tobago and earned 7 caps in total. One of those was a FIFA World Cup qualification match against Cuba.

References

External links 
 

1985 births
Living people
Caymanian footballers
Cayman Islands international footballers
George Town SC players
Scholars International players
Association football midfielders